Malik Edward Stanley (born 7 June 1997) is an American football wide receiver who plays for the Hamburg Sea Devils. He played college football at South Alabama and Louisiana Tech.

High school career
Stanley attended Shawnee Heights High School between 2011 and 2014, where he played football, basketball and athletics. On the football team, he was playing on offense and defense in his final two years. In his senior year in 2014, he won the region championship with the Thunderbirds and was subsequently named All-League First Team as a defensive back and All-League Second Team as a wide receiver. In addition, he earned All-State honors as a DB.

College career
In 2015, Stanley committed to Coffeyville Community College. As a sophomore, he caught 58 passes for 712 yards and six touchdowns for the Red Ravens, earning first-team All-Kansas Jayhawk Community College Conference honors. Stanley was recruited by the University of South Alabama for the 2017 season. He was expected to redshirt early in the year, but ultimately appeared in ten games (starting nine) and recording 324 receiving yards and three touchdowns. He played four games the following year. For his final year of college, he transferred to Louisiana Tech in 2019, where he was an integral part of the Bulldogs offense with 649 receiving yards and three touchdowns. In the 2019 Independence Bowl, he helped his team to a 14–0 win over the Miami Hurricanes with three receptions for 75 yards. For his efforts, he was named honorable mention All-Conference selection. In March 2021, Stanley participated in his alma mater's Pro Day.

Professional career
For the 2021 Indoor Football League season, Stanley was signed by the Tucson Sugar Skulls. He totaled 82 receiving yards and two touchdowns in eight games. In mid-November, the Sugar Skulls announced Stanley's extension for another season. However, Stanley signed a contract with the Panthers Wrocław from the European League of Football (ELF) in March 2022. On the first day of the game against the Leipzig Kings, Stanley caught his first two touchdowns for the Polish team. He eventually recorded 1,099 receiving yards in twelve games, which ranked third league-wide. He missed the playoffs with the Panthers with a 5-7 losing record. After the regular season, he was selected to the ELF All-Star second team.

For the 2023 ELF season, Stanley signed with the Hamburg Sea Devils.

Professional statistics

Private life
Stanley majored in Interdisciplinary Studies at the University of South Alabama. Because of his academic achievements at Louisiana Tech University, he was named to the Conference USA (C-USA) Commissioner's Honor list in 2020 and was awarded a C-USA medal.

References

External links
 Louisiana Tech Bulldogs bio
 South Alabama Jaguars bio

1997 births
Living people
American football defensive backs
American football wide receivers
Coffeyville Red Ravens football players
South Alabama Jaguars football players
Louisiana Tech Bulldogs football players
Panthers Wrocław players
Hamburg Sea Devils (ELF) players
American expatriate players of American football
American expatriate sportspeople in Poland
American expatriate sportspeople in Germany
Players of American football from Kansas
Sportspeople from Topeka, Kansas